Luis Alberto Larrea Alba (25 October 1894, Guayaquil, Ecuador – 17 April 1979, Córdoba, Argentina) was a military officer and acting President of Ecuador in from 24 August to 15 October 1931.

External links
 Official Website of the Ecuadorian Government about the country President's History

References 

1894 births
1979 deaths
People from Guayaquil
Ecuadorian people of Basque descent
Presidents of Ecuador